The Last Illusion is a 1949 German drama film directed by Josef von Báky and starring Fritz Kortner, Johanna Hofer and Lina Carstens. It was entered into the 1949 Cannes Film Festival. It was shot at the Bavaria Studios in Munich. The film's sets were designed by the art directors Fritz Lück, Fritz Maurischat and Hans Sohnle.

Synopsis
A Jewish university professor returns from exile following the end of the Second World War. His hopes of rebuilding a new Germany are undermined by the continuing antisemitism of his colleagues and students.

Cast
 Fritz Kortner as Professor Mauthner
 Johanna Hofer as Lina
 Rosemary Murphy as Mary
 Lina Carstens as Emma
 William Sinnigen as Elliot
 Michael Murphy as Spencer
 Ernst Schröder as Walter
 Paul Hoffmann as Fechner
 Arno Assmann as Kurt
 Charles Régnier as Bertram
 Alwin Edwards as Homer
 Harald Mannl as Fraenkl
 Friedrich Domin as Professor Helfert
 Hans Clarin
 Angelika Schrobsdorff
 Heinz Thiele

References

Bibliography
 Hake, Sabine. German National Cinema. Routledge, 2002.

External links

1949 films
1949 drama films
German drama films
West German films
1940s German-language films
Films directed by Josef von Báky
German black-and-white films
Films about Jews and Judaism
Films about antisemitism
Films shot at Bavaria Studios
1940s German films